The Latvian records in swimming are the fastest ever performances of swimmers from Latvia, which are recognised and ratified by Latvijas Peldesanas Federacija.

All records were set in finals unless noted otherwise.

Long Course (50 m)

Men

Women

Mixed relay

Short Course (25 m)

Men

Women

Mixed relay

Notes

See also
List of Baltic records in swimming

References
General
Latvian Long Course Records - Men 21 June 2022
Latvian Long Course Records - Women 21 June 2022
Latvian Short Course Records - Men 21 June 2019
Latvian Short Course Records - Women 11 February 2022
Specific

External links
Latvijas Peldesanas Federacija web site

National records in swimming
Records
Swimming records
Swimming